Evolution and the Theory of Games is a book by the British evolutionary biologist John Maynard Smith on evolutionary game theory. The book was initially published in December 1982 by Cambridge University Press.

Overview
In the book, John Maynard Smith summarises work on evolutionary game theory that had developed in the 1970s, to which he made several important contributions.  The book is also noted for being well written and not overly mathematically challenging.

The main contribution to be had from this book is the introduction of the Evolutionarily Stable Strategy, or ESS, concept, which states that for a set of behaviours to be conserved over evolutionary time, they must be the most profitable avenue of action when common, so that no alternative behaviour can invade.  So, for instance, suppose that in a population of frogs, males fight to the death over breeding ponds.  This would be an ESS if any one cowardly frog that does not fight to the death always fares worse (in fitness terms, of course).  A more likely scenario is one where fighting to the death is not an ESS because a frog might arise that will stop fighting if it realises that it is going to lose.  This frog would then reap the benefits of fighting, but not the ultimate cost.  Hence, fighting to the death would easily be invaded by a mutation that causes this sort of "informed fighting."  Much complexity can be built from this, and Maynard Smith is outstanding at explaining in clear prose and with simple math.

Reception

See also

 Evolutionary biology

References

External links
 Cambridge University Press

1982 non-fiction books
Books about evolution
Game theory
Evolutionary game theory
Mathematics books